George Joshua Christian Dean (born December 3, 1979 in Burnaby, British Columbia) is a Canadian actor and improvisor. He was raised in Edmonton, Alberta, where he performed in the improvised soap opera Die-Nasty and toured with improv company Rapid Fire Theatre.

Career 
Dean worked with the comedy troupe Gordon's Big Bald Head and appeared in several new works by Canadian playwright Stewart Lemoine. He was a regular cast member in the improvised variety show Oh Susanna! at the Varscona Theatre.

Dean provided the voice of Henpecked Hou (among others) in the game Jade Empire from BioWare Corp. He later appeared in several roles in Bioware's Mass Effect. In 2003, he co-starred in the independent film Purple Gas, and in 2006 starred in the FOX TV sitcom Free Ride. Dean stars in the Martin Gero film Young People Fucking, and National Lampoon's Bag Boy.

Filmography

Film

Television

Video games

External links

1979 births
Living people
Canadian male comedians
Canadian male voice actors
Male actors from British Columbia
People from Burnaby
Comedians from British Columbia